Vassiliy Beresa (sometimes listed as Vasiliy Beresa is a Soviet sprint canoer who competed in the early 1980s. He won a complete set of medals at the ICF Canoe Sprint World Championships with a gold in 1983 (C-1 1000 m), a silver in 1982 (C-2 10000 m), and a bronze in 1982 (C-1 1000 m).

References

Living people
Soviet male canoeists
Year of birth missing (living people)
ICF Canoe Sprint World Championships medalists in Canadian